The Academy of Canadian Cinema & Television presents one or more annual awards for the Best Screenplay for a Canadian film. Originally presented in 1968 as part of the Canadian Film Awards, from 1980 until 2012 the award continued as part of the Genie Awards ceremony. As of 2013, it is presented as part of the Canadian Screen Awards.

In their present form, two awards are presented for Best Original Screenplay and Best Adapted Screenplay, although historically this division was not always observed. In the Canadian Film Awards era, two awards were usually presented in Feature and Non-Feature (television films, short films, etc.) categories, although on two occasions the feature category was further divided into separate categories for Original and Adapted Screenplay, resulting in the presentation of three screenplay awards overall, and on two occasions only one award for Non-Feature Screenplay was presented. Under current Academy rules, the categories are collapsed into one if either category has fewer than five eligible submissions within the qualifying period; however, if both categories receive five or more eligible submissions, then separate awards are presented even if one category or the other ends up with fewer than five final nominees.

1960s

1970s

1980s

1990s

2000s

2010s

2020s

See also
Prix Iris for Best Screenplay

References

Screenwriting awards for film
 
Screenplay